Neil Harvey (born 16 April 1959 in London), is a former English professional squash player.

He won the Essex championship in 1981 before representing the England Under-23 team. He made his debut for England in 1984 and was part of the 1987 Men's World Team Squash Championships English team.

Neil currently lives in Wolfville, Nova Scotia, and is one of the top squash coaches in the world. Neil plays at Saint Mary's University squash courts many days a week and coaches people from five years old to people in their 40s.

References

External links
 

English male squash players
1959 births
Living people